Liv Gustavsen (born 13 March 1967) is a Norwegian politician for the Progress Party.

She served as a deputy representative to the Parliament of Norway from Akershus during the term 2017–2021. Hailing from Årnes, she joined the Progress Party in 2008. In 2011 she became deputy member of Nes municipal council, in 2015 she became a full member as well as deputy member of Akershus county council, and in 2016 she succeeded Hans Andreas Limi as chair of Akershus Progress Party. She resided for many years in Haga and chaired the local sports club Haga IF. Outside of politics, she has spent her entire career in South African Pulp and Paper Industries.

References

1967 births
Living people
People from Nes, Akershus
Deputy members of the Storting
Progress Party (Norway) politicians
Akershus politicians
Norwegian women in politics
Norwegian sports executives and administrators
Women members of the Storting